Stephen Zachary Day (born June 15, 1978) is a former right-handed sinker-ball pitcher in Major League Baseball. He played for two teams from 2002 to 2006.

Career history
Day graduated from La Salle High School in Cincinnati in 1996, where he played basketball, baseball and golf and was prep player of the year in Cincinnati in 1995. He went on to attend the University of Cincinnati, studying pre-business. Drafted in the fifth round in 1996 by the New York Yankees after his senior year in high school, he was traded to the Cleveland Indians in July .

2002
Day made his major league debut for the Montreal Expos in 2002.  His debut was on his birthday, and he was credited the win.  He was the first pitcher to achieve that combination (birthday, debut, win) since at least 1901, possibly ever.  He finished 2002 at 4–1 with a 3.62 ERA in 19 games. He also had 1 save. His one save came on September 26, 2002, during an Expos 4–3 victory over the Marlins. Day pitched the final three innings in perfect fashion (0 runs, 0 hits, 5 strikeouts) to nail down the win for starting pitcher Tony Armas Jr..

2003
Day pitched a career high 23 starts, going 9–8. He led the majors in wild pitches with 13. He was initially named NL Rookie of the Month in April, but the award was revoked and given to Hee-seop Choi due to Day having reached the rookie limit of service days in 2002.

2004
Day's 2004 season was cut short due to injury. He made 19 starts, having a respectable 3.93 ERA despite going 5-10 for the defunct Montreal Expos.

2005
Day managed to pitch in 12 games for the Nationals before being traded to Colorado.

He was 0–1 in 5 games for the Rockies.

2006
Day began the season with the Rockies but was designated for assignment after posting an ERA of 10.80 in 3 starts.

After being claimed off waivers by the Nationals, Day was looking to bounce back to his former self. However, after five appearances, Day was placed on the 60-day DL on May 23 for right shoulder tendinitis and underwent rotator cuff surgery on June 6, ending his  season. The Nationals released Day on October 3, 2006, ending his second stint on the MLB team where he first enjoyed success.

2007
On December 20, 2006, he signed a minor league deal with the Kansas City Royals. He spent the year playing for the Triple-A Omaha Royals, starting nine games and relieving in two more. Day became a free agent at the end of the season.

2008
On January 11, 2008, Day signed a minor league contract with the Minnesota Twins, but was released in early May having made 6 appearances for the Fort Myers Miracle. After his release, he announced his retirement due to continuing shoulder problems.

References

External links

1978 births
Living people
Akron Aeros players
American expatriate baseball players in Canada
Baseball players from Cincinnati
Buffalo Bisons (minor league) players
Colorado Rockies players
Colorado Springs Sky Sox players
Greensboro Bats players
Major League Baseball pitchers
Montreal Expos players
Omaha Royals players
Ottawa Lynx players
Washington Nationals players